Autumn Bailey (born 2 June 1995) is a Canadian female volleyball player. 
She was part of the Canada women's national volleyball team, and participated at the   2018 FIVB Volleyball Women's World Championship.

On club level she played for Marquette University, and Michigan State. She then joined Nilüfer Belediyespor, Turkey Venus League.

References

External links 
 FIVB profile

Living people
1995 births
Canadian women's volleyball players
Sportspeople from Burlington, Ontario
Wing spikers